Westminster Christian School is a private PK3-12 Calvinist school in Palmetto Bay, Florida. WCS is governed by a board of directors- 13 people (mostly current parents, although some have been former faculty) elected by parents of current enrollees. It is operated by a Head of School who is hired by the Board.

Though the school is Calvinist by charter, its students come from a wide variety of denominations, including Presbyterian, Southern Baptist, Catholic, and Orthodox Christian. The parents of students are required to be active members at their local church (as evidenced by a letter from their pastor), and most of the students consider themselves to be Christians.

It is located on 31 acres in the Village of Palmetto Bay, near the Charles Deering Estate.

WCS' mascot name is the "Warriors." The athletic booster club is called the "Chiefs." The school colors are Green and White.

WCS may be most famous for its baseball program and fine arts – especially in choir and string orchestra. WCS is the home to the 1992 and 1996 USA Today National Champion baseball teams, and won several FHSAA state championships under the direction of former coach Rich Hofman. The 1996 team adorned the cover of one of the first Team Cheerios boxes, and notable baseball alumni include World Series winners Alex Rodriguez and Doug Mientkiewicz. The orchestra has taken first place in several national competitions, as well as superior ratings in district and state competitions. It was invited to play at Carnegie Hall in 2002 and 2006, and has also toured Europe.

Westminster Christian School added a new Student Activities Center in 2009, a new Middle School/High School Science Building in 2011, a new Elementary School Building in 2013, and the TIDE Center, a classroom building focused on technology, innovation, design and engineering in 2017. Also, in 2017, Westminster completed the Gutierrez Family Field, which provides additional practice and competition space for the school's growing and accomplished athletic program. In 2019, the WorldWonder Nature Center was added for students in kindergarten through fifth grade convene to study, celebrate, discuss, and piece together the lessons gained in their journeys through WorldWonder. The expansive learning studio boasts glass walls to the south, which allows students to overlook majestic oaks and grounds brimming with areas to be discovered. 
Preschool students interact with the WorldWonder curriculum at The Discovery Barn, another feature of Westminster Elementary School's curriculum. The Lighthouse, Westminster's new performing arts center is currently under construction and is expected to be ready for the 2020-21 school year.

In 2006, Westminster Christian's High School (including the enrolling freshmen) began a program called "Warrior Week." Warrior Week received the Creative Management Award for 2006–2007 from Independent School Management, a leading consulting firm for independent schools. The purpose of Warrior Week is spiritual renewal, relational development, the promotion of academic excellence, in a spirit of fun and adventure.

History 

Around the start of the 20th century Jules Vroon, a two-year-old boy from a conservative Calvinistic family, emigrated from Dinteloord, the Netherlands to the United States to grow up in Michigan's Christian schools where all subjects were taught from a Christian perspective. During the Depression, Vroon, then a husband and father, moved his company to Florida. When he found no Christian schools like those he knew as a boy, he shared his vision to bring Christian education to south Florida with friends at Shenandoah Presbyterian Church. Westminster Christian School opened in 1961 with four teachers and twelve students.

The school was formerly located in the census-designated place of Cutler until the incorporation of Palmetto Bay on September 10, 2002.

Notable alumni
 J. P. Arencibia, Former MLB catcher (Toronto Blue Jays)
 Bill Henderson, 1st round pick 1987 MLB June Amateur Draft, former MiLB catcher (Detroit Tigers)
 Oscar Isaac, Actor 
 Mickey Lopez, Former MLB infielder (Seattle Mariners)
 Doug Mientkiewicz, former MLB player (Minnesota Twins, Boston Red Sox, New York Mets, Kansas City Royals, New York Yankees, Pittsburgh Pirates, Los Angeles Dodgers)
 Dan Perkins, Former MLB pitcher (Minnesota Twins)
 Derek Phillips, stage, screen, & television actor
 Alex Rodriguez, Former MLB infielder (Seattle Mariners, Texas Rangers, New York Yankees)
 MJ Melendez, MLB catcher and outfielder for the Kansas City Royals.

References

External links 
 

1961 establishments in Florida
Christian schools in Florida
Educational institutions established in 1961
Nondenominational Christian schools in the United States
Private K-12 schools in Miami-Dade County, Florida